Teublitz is a town in the district of Schwandorf, in Bavaria, Germany. It is situated on the river Naab, 12 km south of Schwandorf, and 23 km north of Regensburg.

Twin cities 
  Baborów, Opole Voivodeship, Poland
  Blovice, Plzeň Region, Czech Republic

References

Schwandorf (district)